Peter Menzies (5 Feb 1953 – 6 Feb 2015) was an Australian philosopher and past president of the Australasian Association of Philosophy, who held teaching positions at Macquarie University, University of Sydney, and Australian National University.  He specialized in metaphysics, especially the philosophy of causation. He became a fellow of the Australian Academy of the Humanities in 2007.

Menzies was a student of Nancy Cartwright at Stanford University where he received his PhD in 1984.

He and philosopher Huw Price developed a version of Agency Theory of Causation, which is statement of manipulability theory of causation.  In this view, human actors play an important role in cause and effect.

References 

1953 births
2015 deaths
Australian philosophers
Academic staff of Macquarie University
Philosophers of science